Shadow Weaver is an album by the Legendary Pink Dots, released in 1992.

Track listing

(*) Included only on the CD editions.

Personnel
Edward Ka-Spel
Silverman (Phil Knight)
Niels van Hoornblower
Martijn van Kleer
Ryan Moore

Additional personnel
Patrick Q-Wright
Vincent Hoedt – engineer
X-Ray Alley – engineer

Notes
The SPV edition contains different artwork than that of the other editions.

References

The Legendary Pink Dots albums
1992 albums
Caroline Records albums